The Sanctuary of the Santo Hermano Pedro is a pilgrimage temple located in the town of Vilaflor, south of the island of Tenerife (Canary Islands, Spain). The shrine is dedicated to Saint Peter of Saint Joseph Betancur, the first Saint of the Canary Islands.

History 
In the place of the Sanctuary was originally the natal house of the Saint Peter of Betancur, which had not been preserved but yes exact location.

In 1776 arrives on the place the male branch of the Bethlehemites, who initiated the construction of a temple at the exact place where the Saint was born. But due to political reforms in the nineteenth century in Spain, the temple was unfinished.

In 1981 with the arrival of the Sisters Bethlehemites project was continued and resumed work in 1991. The Sanctuary was definitely over the April 28, 2002, the day that was blessed by the Bishop of the Diocese of Tenerife, Felipe Fernández García.

Features 

This temple is the relic of a vertebra of Pedro de Betancur and bell he used to summon the faithful. In the main altar are images of Peter of Saint Joseph Betancur and Blessed María Encarnación Rosal, Bethlehemites Sisters reformer. In the central part of the altarpiece is in high relief the scene of the Nativity of Jesus in Bethlehem, central theme of Bethlehemite spirituality.

It is a temple of a single ship that has attached a convent run by the Sisters Betlemitas. The temple has a feature stone facade and is just behind the Parish of St. Peter the Apostle in the center of the town.

From the nearby Church of Saint Peter starts the "Camino del Hermano Pedro", a pastoral path which the Saint ran to move his flock over the region to the Cave of Santo Hermano Pedro. Currently on the feast of the Saint in April, hundreds pilgrims travel this route which has great religious and historical interest.

References

See also 
 Peter of Saint Joseph Betancur
 Bethlehemites

Catholic Church in the Canary Islands
Churches in Tenerife
Roman Catholic churches completed in 2002